Tom Beim (born 11 December 1975 in Frimley, England) is a former rugby union footballer, who played on the wing for Sale, Gloucester, Viadana, Pertemps Bees, the Barbarians and England. He is now a professional polo player for Lodge Services Polo team for Stuart Lodge

Club Rugby
Beim was a prolific try scorer in the Premiership with Gloucester and Sale before moving to Italian side Viadana. Beim holds number of records to tries scored in a Heineken Cup game, he touching down five times against Italian club Roma. During his two seasons at Viadana he scored 31 tries. After a succession of injuries, Beim retired from professional rugby and has carved out a successful international polo career ever since. Whilst at Gloucester he started in the 2002 Zurich Championship Final (the year before winning the play-offs constituted winning the English title) in which Gloucester defeated Bristol Rugby.

International Rugby
Beim made two appearances for England during a summer tour at New Zealand in 1998 and featured in the England squad again in 2002 when he was called in as a replacement during the tour match of Argentina. He later went their playing for the England A side on a number of occasions. He also appeared for the Barbarians.

References

External links
 Beim for Bees (15 July 2005)
 Beim to look for new club (6 June 2003)
 Beim Ready For Action (3 April 2002)

English rugby union players
1975 births
Living people
Gloucester Rugby players
Sale Sharks players
Barbarian F.C. players
England international rugby union players
Birmingham & Solihull R.F.C. players
Sportspeople from Gloucestershire
People educated at Cheltenham College
Rugby union wings
Rugby union players from Frimley